Mother (Hungarian: Mámi) is a 1937 Hungarian comedy film directed by Johann von Vásáry and starring Sári Fedák, Jenő Pataky and Lia Szepes. The film was based on a play by Rezsö Török, with art direction by Márton Vincze. The arrival from Texas of an eccentric relative and her son, disrupt the rhythm of a wealthy Hungarian family.

Cast
 Sári Fedák as Mámi, Özvegy Kovács Gáspárné  
 Jenő Pataky as Kovács Gazsi  
 Lia Szepes as Horváth Ilonka  
 Jenő Törzs as Torday Henrik, bankvezér  
 István Bársony as Inas  
 Piri Vaszary as Torday nőrokona 
 Andor Heltai as Cigányprímás  
 Béla Mihályffi as Mr. Benedek  
 Sándor Peti as Kárpáthi úr 
 Annie Réthy as Benedek felesége 
 Mary Vágó as Benedek lánya

References

External links 

1937 films
Hungarian comedy films
1937 comedy films
1930s Hungarian-language films
Hungarian films based on plays
Films directed by Johann von Vásáry
Hungarian black-and-white films